Brigitte Groh (29 June 1966 – 16 November 1997) was a German figure skater. She competed in the pairs event at the 1988 Winter Olympics.

References

1966 births
1997 deaths
German female pair skaters
Olympic figure skaters of West Germany
Figure skaters at the 1988 Winter Olympics
Sportspeople from Mannheim